This is a list of Esteghlal F.C.'s results at the 2008–09 IPL, 2009 ACL, Super Cup 2008 and 2008–09 Hazfi Cup. The club is competing in the Iran Pro League, Hazfi Cup. Iranian Super Cup and Asian Champions League.

Persian Gulf Cup

Statistics

Matches 

Last updated Apr 26 2009

Results by round

Results summary

League standings

Top scorers and assists

Goal scorers 

20
  Arash Borhani

12
  Siavash Akbarpour

8
  Mojtaba Jabari

6
  Hossein Kazemi

5
  Pirouz Ghorbani

4
  Alireza Abbasfard
  Fábio Januário

3
  Farhad Majidi

2
  Mehdi Amirabadi

1
  Khosro Heydari
  Hashem Beikzadeh
  Ali Alizadeh
  Mehrdad Pooladi

Assists 

8
  Fábio Januário

7
  Khosro Heydari

5
  Siavash Akbarpour

4
  Mojtaba Jabari
  Meysam Maniei

3
  Ali Alizadeh
  Farhad Majidi

2
  Yadollah Akbari
  Alireza Abbasfard
  Hashem Beikzadeh
  Arash Borhani

1
  Pirouz Ghorbani
  Hossein Kazemi
  Mehdi Amirabadi
  Mehrdad Pooladi

Cards

Matches played 

29
  Vahid Talebloo

28
  Pirouz Ghorbani

27
  Khosro Heydari

Hazfi Cup

Bracket

Scorers

Goalscorers

5
  Arash Borhani

1
  Ahmad Khaziravi
  Mehdi Amirabadi
  Farhad Majidi
  Milad Nouri
  Ali Alizadeh

Goalassistants

2
  Mehdi Amirabadi

1
  Ahmad Khaziravi
  Meysam Maniei

Cards

Season statistics 

Last updated Apr 16 2009

Goalscorers 

26
  Arash Borhani

12
  Siavash Akbarpour

Goalassistants 

8
  Fábio Januário

2009 Asian Champions League

Group C

Matches

Top scorers

Goal scorers 

2
  Arash Borhani
  Ali Alizadeh

1
  Hossein Kazemi
  Hadi Shakouri

Assists 

1
  Khosro Heydari
  Meysam Maniei

Cards

2008/2009 Transfers 

In:

Out:

References
 Iran Pro League Statistics
 Persian League

2008-09
Iranian football clubs 2008–09 season